Encino (Spanish for "oak") is a neighborhood in the San Fernando Valley region of Los Angeles, California.

History

In 1769, the Spanish Portolá expedition, first Europeans to see inland areas of California, traveled north through Sepulveda Pass into the San Fernando Valley on August 5 and stayed two nights at a native village near what is now Los Encinos State Historic Park. Fray Juan Crespi, a Franciscan missionary traveling with the expedition, named the valley "El Valle de Santa Catalina de Bolonia de Los Encinos" (The Valley of St. Catherine of Bologna of the Holm Oaks). All of Crespi's name was later dropped except "Encino".

Rancho Los Encinos (Ranch of Holm Oaks) was established in 1845 when a large parcel of former Mission San Fernando land was granted to three Mission Indians by governor Pio Pico. Many ranchos were created after the secularization of the California missions, which began in 1834. Encino derives its name from the rancho.

Demographics

The 2000 U.S. census counted 41,905 residents in the  Encino neighborhood — , among the lowest population densities for the city but average for the county. In 2008, the city estimated that the resident population had increased to 44,581.

In 2000 the median age for residents was 42, considered old for city and county neighborhoods; the percentages of residents aged 50 and older were among the county's highest.

The neighborhood demographic breakdown was whites, 80.1%; Latinos, 8.5%; Asians, 4.9%; blacks, 2.4%; and others, 4.1%.  Iran (30.1%) and Russia (6.4%) were the most common places of birth for the 32.8% of the residents who were born abroad—an average percentage for Los Angeles.

The median yearly household income in 2008 dollars was $78,529, considered high for the city. The percentage of households that earned $125,000 and up was high for Los Angeles County. The average household size of 2.3 people was low when compared to the rest of the city and the county. Renters occupied 38.4% of the housing stock and house- or apartment-owners held 61.6%.

The percentages of divorced residents and of widowed men and women were among the county's highest. In 2000 military veterans amounted to 10.6% of the population, a high rate for the county.

Geography

Encino is situated in the central portion of the southern San Fernando Valley and on the north slope of the Santa Monica Mountains. It is flanked on the north by Reseda, Lake Balboa, and the Sepulveda Basin, on the east by Sherman Oaks, on the south by Brentwood, and on the west by Tarzana.

Climate

Economy

The local economy provides jobs primarily in health care (including one of two Encino-Tarzana Regional Medical Center hospitals), social services, and professional services (accounting and financial services, real estate, and legal) sectors. There are approximately 3,800 businesses employing about 27,000 people at an annual payroll of $1.4 billion.

Government and infrastructure
Encino is in Los Angeles County Board of Supervisors district 3 and Los Angeles City Council District 4. It is also represented within the city of Los Angeles by the Encino Neighborhood Council, an advisory body.

The United States Postal Service operates the Encino Post Office at 5805 White Oak Avenue and the Balboa Van Nuys Post Office at 4930 Balboa Boulevard.

Transportation
A Park and Ride lot with 160 spaces is located at 5174 Hayvenhurst Avenue, which provides connections to various LADOT commuter buses.

Education
By 2000, forty-six percent of Encino residents aged 25 and older had earned a four-year degree, a high percentage for both the city and the county. The percentage of those residents with a master's degree or higher was also high for the county.

Schools within the Encino boundaries are:

Public
Encino is served by the Los Angeles Unified School District (LAUSD).
 Hesby Oaks Leadership Charter School (K-8 school)
 Encino Charter Elementary School
 Emelita Street Elementary School
 Fred E. Lull Special Education Center
 Lanai Road Elementary School

As of 2009, there were no public high schools in Encino. Public high schools serving portions of Encino were Birmingham High School in Lake Balboa, and Reseda High School in Reseda.

In 1982 the board considered closing Rhoda Street Elementary School in Encino. In April 1983 an advisory committee of the LAUSD recommended closing eight LAUSD schools, including Rhoda Street School. In August 1983 the board publicly considered closing Rhoda, which had 262 students at the time. In 1984 the board voted to close the Rhoda Street School.

Private

 Sage Academy, elementary, 5901 Lindley Avenue
 Westmark School, 5461 Louise Avenue
 Holy Martyrs Armenian High School/Ferrahian, 5300 White Oak Avenue
 Crespi Carmelite High School, 5031 Alonzo Avenue
 Our Lady of Grace School, elementary, 17720 Ventura Boulevard
 Los Encinos School, elementary, 17114 Ventura Boulevard
 Saint Cyril of Jerusalem, elementary, 4650 Haskell Avenue
 Valley Beth Shalom Day School, 15739 Ventura Boulevard
 International School of Los Angeles (Lycee International de Los Angeles), 5933 Lindley Avenue

Parks and recreation
California State Parks operates the  Los Encinos State Historic Park in Encino. The park includes the original nine room de la Ossa Adobe, the Garnier Building, a blacksmith shop, a pond, and a natural spring.

The Sepulveda Dam Recreation Area, located in Encino, includes the Woodley Worel/Magnus Cricket Complex.
Also included in the basin is the Encino Golf Course and the Balboa Golf Course.

The Balboa Sports Complex in Encino includes a lighted baseball diamond, lighted outdoor basketball courts, a children's play area, a community room, a lighted football field, a lighted handball court, an indoor gymnasium without weights and with a capacity for 400 people, an unlighted soccer field, lighted tennis courts, and lighted volleyball courts. The Sepulveda Basin Off-leash Dog Park is a dog park in Encino. The dog park has  of leash-free dog area, a  small dog area, an on-leash picnic area, 100 parking spots, and public telephones.

Notable people

A–K
 Bud Abbott, comedian
 Steve Allen, actor, author
 Don Ameche, actor
 Daniel Amen, psychiatrist, born in Encino
 Marc Anthony, singer-songwriter
 Gilbert Arenas, NBA player
 Catherine Bach, actress
 Colleen Ballinger, actress, comedian, singer
 Foster Brooks, comedian
 Edgar Rice Burroughs, author
 Reggie Bush, NFL player
 Richard Carlson, actor and film director
 Jack Carson, actor
 Johnny Carson, talk show host
Dana Carvey, actor-comedian
 Johnny Cash, singer
 Richard Crenna, actor
 James Charles, makeup artist, influencer 
 Marie Currie, singer and actress, born in Encino
 Sondra Currie, actress
 Lenny Dykstra, professional athlete
 Percy Faith, bandleader, orchestrator, composer and conductor
 Alice Faye, actress
 David Forst, general manager of Oakland Athletics
 Annette Funicello, actress
 Clark Gable, actor
 David Gregory, television journalist
 Dave Grohl, musician
 Selena Gomez, singer and actor
 Phil Harris, musician
 Phil Hartman, actor
 David Hasselhoff, actor and singer
 Chick Hearn, sportscaster
 Edward Everett Horton, actor
 Ron Howard, actor, director and producer
 Ice Cube, rapper and actor
 Jackson family, musical group
 Samuel L. Jackson, actor and producer
 Kelly Johnson, engineer, Lockheed Aircraft executive 
 Al Jolson, singer and actor
 Victoria Justice, actress and singer
 Daren Kagasoff, actor, born in Encino
 Lisa Kudrow, actress
 Ted Greene, jazz guitarist, music educator

L–Z
 Nick Lachey, singer
 Tim Laker, professional baseball player
 Robin Lane, rock singer/songwriter
 Martin Lawrence, actor and comedian
 Carole Lombard, actress
 Julie London, actress
 Sean McVay, head coach of the Los Angeles Rams
 Jayne Meadows, actor, author
 Leighton Meester, actress and singer 
 Michael Milken, financier; born in Encino
 Mahbod Moghadam, internet entrepreneur
 Lori Nelson, actress
 Barney Oldfield, race car driver
 Kelly Paris, baseball player; born in Encino
 Candace Parker and Shelden Williams, basketball stars
 Chris Paul, NBA player
 Logan Paul, YouTuber, actor, and director 
 Daniel Pearl, journalist
 Tom Petty, singer-songwriter
 Richard Pryor, actor and comedian
Jeff Rake, producer and screenwriter
 Billy Ray (born 1971), screenwriter and film director
 Sally Ride, physicist and astronaut; born in Encino
 Jenni Rivera, singer
 Mickey Rooney, actor
 Kyle Richards, actress
 Ann Sheridan, actress
 Ashlee Simpson, singer and actress
 Slash, musician
 Kenny Smith, NBA player and TNT host
 Kader Sylla, professional skateboarder
 Bob Thomas, Hollywood reporter and author
 John Travolta, actor
 Arthur Treacher, actor
 Steve Vai, guitarist
 John Wayne, actor and director
 Jack Webb, actor and director
 Roger Williams, pianist
 John Wooden, basketball coach

Notable attractions

The Encino Velodrome has provided an outdoor oval bicycle racing track since 1961.

Los Encinos State Historic Park features historic buildings, a small museum, and picnic grounds. In 2009 it faced closure due to California's budget crisis. The Park remains open today.

The Sepulveda Basin Recreation Area is a large area with multiple golf courses, tennis courts, soccer fields, baseball diamonds, bike paths, and a lake bordered by about 2,000 Pink Cloud cherry trees that blossom in the spring. Encino Park was founded around 1937 and has a playground, as well as basketball courts and two lighted tennis courts.

For over a millennium, the area known as Encino was the home of a massive California live oak known as the Encino Oak Tree. It is possible that Encino is named because of this particular tree.  (Encino is the Spanish word for "evergreen" or "holm oak.") It was known for its size and longevity. The tree died on February 7, 1998, after an El Niño storm felled it. Today there is a monument to the tree at the corner of Ventura Boulevard and Louise Avenue where the Encino Oak once stood.

In popular culture
Encino is a recurring location in the SpongeBob SquarePants series, where the character Patchy the Pirate takes residence in the neighborhood. In the special episode Atlantis SquarePantis, Patchy stars in a subplot in which he had to return home to Encino to watch the new SpongeBob episode, but the neighborhood had disappeared.
The 1992 movie Encino Man revolves around two geeky teenagers from Encino who discover a caveman in their backyard, frozen in a block of ice where he has to learn to live in the 20th century while teaching the teenagers about life.
Paul Thomas Anderson's 2021 movie Licorice Pizza is largely set in 1970s Encino.
Frank Zappa's song "Valley Girl" mentions Encino in the lyrics.
The movie "Fast Times At Ridgemont High" filmed several scenes in Encino.
In the "Columbo" TV series episode "A Bird In The Hand," the scene where Columbo visits a car dealership was filmed in Encino.
 The 2022 comedy horror film Studio 666 sees Foo Fighters frontman Dave Grohl battle supernatural forces while the band try to record an album in an Encino mansion.
In the Gex video game series, the eponymous character grew up in Encino.

Gallery

References

Works cited

 
 
 
 
 
 
 
 
 
 Johnson, Clarence L.; Smith, Maggie (1985). More than My Share of It All. Smithsonian Institution.

External links

 "A history rooted in farms and film stars", Los Angeles Times, Real Estate section, Neighborly Advice column, 17 July 2005
 "Rancho Los Encinos", Historic Adobes of Los Angeles County
 Encino crime map and statistics

 
Communities in the San Fernando Valley
Neighborhoods in Los Angeles
Populated places established in 1845
Populated places in the Santa Monica Mountains